The Garuda Purana is one of 18 Mahāpurāṇa texts in Hinduism. It is a part of Vaishnavism literature corpus, primarily centering around Hindu god Vishnu. Composed in Sanskrit and also available in various languages like Gujarati  and English. The earliest version of the text may have been composed in the first millennium CE, but it was likely expanded and changed over a long period of time.

The Garuda Purana text is known in many versions, contains 15000+ verses. Its chapters encyclopedically deal with a highly diverse collection of topics. The text contains cosmology, mythology, relationship between gods, ethics, good versus evil, various schools of Hindu philosophies, the theory of Yoga, the theory of "heaven and hell" with "karma and rebirth", ancestral rites and soteriology, rivers and geography, types of minerals and stones, testing methods for gems for their quality, listing of plants and herbs, various diseases and their symptoms, various medicines, aphrodisiacs, prophylactics, Hindu calendar and its basis, astronomy, moon, planets, astrology, architecture, building home, essential features of a Hindu temple, rites of passage, charity and gift making, economy, thrift, duties of a king, politics, state officials and their roles and how to appoint them, genre of literature, rules of grammar, and other topics. The final chapters discuss how to practice Yoga (Samkhya and Advaita types), personal development and the benefits of self-knowledge.

The Padma Purana categorizes the Purana, along with itself, Bhagavata Purana and Vishnu Purana, as a Sattva Purana (a purana which represents goodness and purity). The text, like all Mahapuranas, is attributed to sage Veda Vyāsa in the Hindu tradition.

History
According to Pintchman, the text was composed sometime in the first millennium of the common era, but it was likely compiled and changed over a long period of time. Gietz et al. place the first version of the text only between the fourth century CE and the eleventh century.

Leadbeater states that the text is likely from about 900 CE, given that it includes chapters on Yoga and Tantra techniques that likely developed later. Other scholars suggest that the earliest core of the text may be from the first centuries of the common era, and additional chapters were added thereafter through the sixth century or later.

The version of Garuda Purana that survives into the modern era, states Dalal, is likely from 800 to 1000 CE with sections added in the 2nd-millennium. Pintchman suggests 850 to 1000 CE. Chaudhuri and Banerjee, as well as Hazra, on the other hand, state it cannot be from before about the tenth or eleventh century CE.

The text exists in many versions, with varying numbers of chapters, and considerably different content. Some Garuda Purana manuscripts have been known by the title of Sauparna Purana (mentioned in Bhagavata Purana section 12.13), Tarksya Purana (the Persian scholar Al-Biruni who visited India mentions this name), and Vainateya Purana (mentioned in Vayu Purana section 2.42 and 104.8).

In the late nineteenth century and early twentieth century, a text called Garudapuranasaroddhara was published, then translated by Ernest Wood and SV Subrahmanyam. This, states Ludo Rocher, created major confusion because it was mistaken for Garuda Purana, when it is not, a misidentification first discovered by Albrecht Weber. Garuda-purana-saroddhara actually is the original bhasya work of Naunidhirama, that cites a section of now non-existent version of Garuda Purana as well as other Indian texts. The earliest translation of one version of Garuda Purana, by Manmatha Nath Dutt, was published in the early twentieth century.

Structure

The Garuda Purana is a Vaishnava Purana and has, according to the tradition, 19,000 shlokas (verses). However, the manuscripts that have survived into the modern era have preserved about eight thousand verses. These are divided into two parts, a Purva Khanda (early section) and an Uttara Khanda (later section). The Purva Khanda contains about 229 chapters, but in some versions of the text this section has between 240–243 chapters.  The Uttara Khanda varies between 34 and 49 chapters. The Uttara Khanda is more often known as Pretakhanda or Pretakalpa..The Venkatesvara Edition of the Purana has an additional Khanda named Brahma Khanda.

The Garuda Purana was likely fashioned after the Agni Purana, the other major medieval India encyclopedia that has survived.  The text's structure is idiosyncratic, in that it is a medley, and does not follow the theoretical structure expected in a historic Puranic genre of Indian literature. It is presented as information that Garuda (the man-bird vehicle of Vishnu) learned from Vishnu, and then narrated by Garuda to sage Kashyapa, which then spread in the mythical forest of Naimisha reaching sage Vyasa.

Contents: Purvakhanda
The largest section (90%) of the text is Purva Khanda that discusses a wide range of topics associated with life and living. The remaining is Pretakhanda, which deals primarily with rituals associated with death and cremation.

Cosmology
The cosmology presented in Garuda Purana revolves around Vishnu and Lakshmi, and it is their union that created the universe. Vishnu is the unchanging reality called Brahman, while Lakshmi is the changing reality called Maya. The goddess is the material cause of the universe, the god acts to begin the process.

The cosmogenesis in Garuda Purana, like other Puranas, weaves the Samkhya theory of two realities, the Purusha (spirit) and Prakriti (matter), the masculine and feminine presented as interdependent, each playing a different but essential role to create the observed universe. Goddess Lakshmi is the creative power of Prakriti, cosmic seed and the source of creation. God Vishnu is the substance of Purusha, the soul and the constant. The masculine and the feminine are presented by the Garuda Purana, states Pintchman, as an inseparable aspect of the same divine, metaphysical truth Brahman.

The Garuda Purana, states Madan, elaborates the repeatedly found theme in Hindu religious thought that the living body is a microcosm of the universe, governed by the same laws and made out of the same substances. All the gods are inside the human body, what is outside the body is present within it as well. Body and cosmos, states Madan, are equated in this theme. Vishnu is presented by the text as the supreme soul within the body.

Worship of Vishnu, Lakshmi, Shiva, Surya, Ganesha, Durga and others
The text describes Vishnu, Vaishnava festivals and Puja (worship), and offers Mahatmya—a pilgrimage tour guide to Vishnu-related sacred places. However, the Garuda Purana also includes significant sections with reverence for Shaiva, Shakti and Smarta traditions, including the Panchayatana puja of Vishnu, Shiva, Durga, Surya (Sun) and Ganesha.

Features of a temple

The Garuda Purana includes chapters on the architecture and design of a temple. It recommends that a plot of ground should be divided into 64 squares, with the four innermost squares forming the Chatuskon (adytum). The core of the temple, states the text, should be reachable through 12 entrances, and the walls of the temple raised touching the 48 of the squares. The height of the temple plinth should be based on the length of the platform, the vault in the inner sanctum should be co-extensive with adytum's length with the indents therein set at a third and a fifth ratio of the inner vault's chord. The arc should be half the height of pinnacle, and the text describes various ratios of the temple's exterior to the adytum, those within adytum and then that of the floor plan to the Vimana (spire).

The second design details presented in the Garuda Purana is for a 16 square grid, with four inner squares (pada) for the adytum. The text thereafter presents the various ratios for the temple design. The dimensions of the carvings and images on the walls, edifices, pillars and the murti are recommended by the text to be certain harmonic proportions of the layout (length of a pada), the adytum and the spire.

Temples, asserts the text, exist in many thematic forms. These include the Bairaja (rectangle themed), Puspakaksa (quadrilateral themed), Kailasha (circular themed), Malikahvaya (segments of sphere themed) and the Tripistapam (octagon themed). These five themes, claims Garuda Purana, have created 45 different styles of temples, from the Meru style to Shrivatsa style. Each thematic form of temple architecture permits nine styles of temples, and the Purana lists all 45 styles. The inner edifice of a temple is best in five shapes, in these various styles of temples, and the edifice can be triangle, lotus-shaped, crescent, rectangular and octagonal, asserts the text. The text thereafter describes the design guidelines for the Mandapa and the Garbha Griha.

The temple design, states Jonathan Parry, follows the homology at the foundation of Hindu thought, that the cosmos and body are harmonious correspondence of each other, the temple is a model and reminder of this cosmic homology.

Gemology

The Garuda Purana describes 14 gems, their varieties and how to test their quality. The gems discussed include ruby, pearl, yellow sapphire, hessonite, emerald, diamond, cats eye, Blue Sapphire, coral, red garnet, jade, colorless quartz, and bloodstone. The technical discussion of gems in the text is woven with its theories on the mythical creation of each gem, astrological significance and talisman benefits.

The text describes the characteristics of the gems, how to clean and make jewelry from them, cautioning that gem experts should be consulted before buying them. For pearl, for example, it describes using Jamvera fruit juice (contains lime) mixed with boiled rice starch in order to clean and soften pearls, then pierced to make holes for jewelry. A sequential Vitanapatti method of cleaning, states the text, wherein the pearls are cleaned with hot water, wine and milk gives the best results. A pearl, asserts the text, should be examined by friction test which it describes. Similar procedures and tests are described for emerald, jade, diamonds and all 14 gems the text includes.

Laws of virtue
Chapter 93 of the Garuda Purvakhanda presents sage Yajnavalkya's theory on laws of virtue. The text asserts that knowledge is condensed in the Vedas, in texts of different schools of philosophy such as Nyaya and Mimamsa, the Shastras on Dharma, on making money and temporal sciences written by 14 holy sages. Thereafter, through Yajnavalkya, the text presents its laws of virtue. The first one, it lists, is charity (Dāna), which it defines as follows,

The text similarly discusses the following virtues—right conduct, damah (self-restraint), ahimsa (non-killing, non-violence in actions, words and thoughts), studying the Vedas, and performing rites of passage. The text presents different set of diet and rites of passage rules based on the varna (social class) of a person. The Brahmin, for example, is advised to forgo killing animals and eating meat, while it is suggested to undertake Upanayana (holy thread ceremony) at the youngest age. No dietary rules are advised for Shudra, nor is the thread ceremony discussed. These chapters on laws of virtue, in one version of the Garuda Purana, are borrowed and a duplicate of nearly 500 verses found in the Yajnavalkya Smriti. The various versions of Garuda Purana show significant variations.

The Garuda Purana asserts that the highest and most imperative religious duty is to introspect into one's own soul, seeking self-communion.

Nityaachaara
The chapter 108 and thereafter, present Garuda Purana's theories on Nityaachaara (नित्याचार, ethics and right conduct) towards others.

Save money for times of distress, asserts Garuda Purana, but be willing to give it up all to save your wife. It is prudent to sacrifice oneself to save a family, and it is prudent to sacrifice one family to save a village. It is prudent to save a country if left with a choice to save the country or a village. Yet, in verses that follow, it says a man should renounce that country whose inhabitants champion prejudice, and forgo the friend who he discovers to be deceitful.

The text cautions against application of knowledge which is wedded to meanness,  against pursuit of physical beauty without ennobling mind, and against making friends with those who abandon their dear ones in adversity. It is the nature of all living beings to pursue one's own self-interest. Yet, do not acquire wealth through vicious means or by bowing down to your enemies.

Men of excellence live with honest means, are true to their wives, pass their time in intellectual pursuits and are hospitable to newcomers. Eternal are the rewards when one weds one's knowledge with noble nature, deep is the friendship roused by connection of the soul. The discussion on ethics is mixed in other chapters.

The good government
Governance is part of the Neeti Shaastra section of the Garuda Purana, and this section influenced later Indian texts on politics and economy.

The Purvakhanda, from chapter 111 onwards describes the characteristics of a good king and good government. Dharma should guide the king, the rule should be based on truth and justice, and he must protect the country from foreign invaders. Taxation should be bearable, never cause hardship on the merchants or taxpayers, and should be similar in style to one used by the florist who harvests a few flowers without uprooting the plants and while sustaining the future crops. A good government advances order and prosperity for all.

A stable king is one whose kingdom is prosperous, whose treasury is full, and who never chastises his ministers or servants. He secures services from the qualified, honest and virtuous, rejects the incapable, wicked and malicious, states chapter 113. A good government collects taxes like a bee collecting honey from all the flowers when ready and without draining any flower.

Dhanvantari Samhita and medicine
Chapters 146 to 218 of the Garuda Purana's Purvakhanda present the Dhanvantari Samhita, its treatise on medicine. The opening verses assert that the text will now describe pathology, pathogeny and symptoms of all diseases studied by ancient sages, in terms of its causes, incubative stage, manifestation in full form, amelioration, location, diagnosis and treatment.

Parts of the pathology and medicine-related chapters of Garuda Purana, states Ludo Rocher, are similar to Nidanasthana of Vagbhata's Astangahridaya, and these two may be different manuscript recensions of the same underlying but now lost text. Other chapters of Garuda Purana, such as those on nutrition and diet to prevent diseases, states Susmita Pande, are similar to those found in the more ancient Hindu text Sushruta Samhita.

The text includes various lists of diseases, agricultural products, herbs, formulations with claims to medicinal value and such information. In chapters 202 and 227 of the Purvakhanda, for example, Sanskrit names of over 450 plants and herbs are listed with claims to nutritional or medicinal value.

Veterinary science
The chapter 226 of the text presents veterinary diseases of horses and their treatment. The verses describe various types of ulcers and cutaneous infections in horses, and 42 herbs for veterinary care formulations.

Yoga, Brahma Gita
The last ten chapters of the Purvakhanda is dedicated to Yoga, and is sometimes referred to as the Brahma Gita. This section is notable for references to Hindu deity Dattatreya as the Guru of Ashtang (eight limbed) Yoga.

The text describes a variety of Asanas (postures), then adds that the postures are means, not the goal. The goal of yoga is meditation, samadhi and self-knowledge.

The Garuda Purana in chapter 229, states Ian Whicher, recommends using saguna Vishnu (with form like a murti) in the early stages of Yoga meditation to help concentration and draw in one's attention with the help of the gross form of the object. After this has been mastered, states the text, the meditation should shift from saguna to nirguna, unto the subtle, abstract formless Vishnu within, with the help of a guru (teacher). These ideas of Garuda Purana were influential, and were cited by later texts such as in verse 3.3 of the 17th-century Arthabodhini.

Contents: Pretakhanda

The second section of the text, also known as Uttara Khanda and Pretakalpa, includes chapters on funeral rites and life after death. This section was commented upon by Navanidhirama in his publication Garuda Purana Saroddhara and translated by Wood and Subramanyam in 1911.

The text specifies the following for last rites:

The Pretakhanda is the second and minor part of Garuda Purana. It is, states Rocher, "entirely unsystematic work" presented with motley confusion and many repetitions in the Purana, dealing with "death, the dead and beyond". Monier Monier-Williams wrote in 1891, that portions of verses recited at cremation funerals are perhaps based on this relatively modern section of the Garuda Purana, but added that Hindu funeral practices do not always agree with guidance in the Garuda Purana. Three quite different versions of Pretakhanda of Garuda Purana are known, and the variation between the chapters, states Jonathan Parry, is enormous.

The Pretakhanda also talks in details about the various types of hell and the sins that can lead one into them. It gives a detailed description of what a soul goes through after death, having met the yamaduta and the journey to naraka in the year following the death.

Contents: Brahma Khanda

Available only in the Venkateswara Edition of the Garuda Purana, it has 29 chapters in the form of an interlocution between Krishna and Garuda, on the supremacy of Vishnu, the nature and form of other Gods, description of the shrine of Venkateswara at Tirupati and other Tirthas there. While speaking about the supremacy of Vishnu and the nature of other gods, it criticises some of the Advaitic doctrines (like Upadhi, Maya, Avidya) and upholds the doctrine of Madhvacharya's school; a distinctive feature which is scarecely observed in any other purana.

The form and the contents of this section prove its later origin, a fact further substantiated by the absence of any reference to this section in other Puranas such as the Narada Purana.

See also
Bhagavata Purana
Ganesha Purana
Skanda Purana

References

Bibliography

External links
   [The Translated garuda puranam in Tamil] 
The Garuda Purana, full English translation by Dutt, 1908
The Garuda Puran in English, Hindi and Sanskrit
The Garuda Purana Saroddhara of Navanidhirama, Translated by Wood and Subrahmanyam, 1911, at sacred-texts.com

Puranas
Sanskrit encyclopedias